The 2018 Memphis Tigers football team represented the University of Memphis in the 2018 NCAA Division I FBS football season. The Tigers played their home games at the Liberty Bowl Memorial Stadium in Memphis, Tennessee and competed in the West Division of the American Athletic Conference. They were led by third-year head coach Mike Norvell. They finished the season 8–6, 5–3 in AAC to finish in a three-way tie for the West Division championship. After tie-breakers, they represented the West Division in the AAC Championship Game where they lost to East Division champion UCF. They were invited to the Birmingham Bowl where they lost to Wake Forest.

Previous season
The Tigers finished the 2017 season 10–3, 7–1 in AAC play to be champions of the West Division. They represented the West Division in The American Championship Game where they lost to East Division champions UCF. They were invited to the Liberty Bowl where they lost to Iowa State.

Preseason

Award watch lists
Listed in the order that they were released

AAC media poll
The AAC media poll was released on July 24, 2018, with the Tigers predicted to win the AAC West Division.

Personnel

Depth chart

Schedule

Game summaries

Mercer

at Navy

Georgia State

South Alabama

at Tulane

UConn

UCF

at Missouri

at East Carolina

Tulsa

at SMU

Houston

at UCF (AAC Championship Game)

vs. Wake Forest (Birmingham Bowl)

Players drafted into the NFL

References

Memphis
Memphis Tigers football seasons
Memphis Tigers football